Life on Top was an American softcore drama series based on the novel of the same name by Clara Darling. It aired on Cinemax from October 3, 2009 to April 1, 2011 with 26 episodes focusing on young corporate professionals with four women as the de facto main characters.

Although it is heavily implied to be Manhattan, principal photography was in Bucharest, Romania over five weeks, with the help of production company Castel Film Romania. A map of Romania can be seen in Season 1, Episode 2 and the vast majority of the supporting cast shown in the end credits is Romanian.

In 2015, Life on Top was featured in Under the Gun Theater's performance of Porn Minus Porn, a comedy show where actors parody softcore porn by cold reading scripts.

Cast and characters 
 Heather Vandeven as Bella Marie: A successful erotic model for "life on top" and Sophie's older sister.
 Mary LeGault as Sophie Beale: A college graduate who has moved to New York City and is living with her older sister Bella. Sophie is a financial analyst for an online poker player.
 Krista Ayne as Maya: Moved to New York City following her best friend and college roommate Sophie. Maya later develops an interest in kickboxing and begins training for fights.
 Mia Presley as Cassia: The sous chef at Les Delices Restaurant, and Bella's best friend. She hopes to start her own restaurant one day.

Episode list

Season 1 (2009)

Season 2 (2011)

References

External links
 Life on Top at IMDb

2009 American television series debuts
2011 American television series endings
2000s American drama television series
2010s American drama television series
Cinemax original programming
Television series by Warner Bros. Television Studios
Television shows based on American novels
Erotic television series
Television shows set in New York City